is located in Daisetsuzan National Park, Hokkaidō, Japan. Its name was derived from the Ainu words for "place with many flowers" or "place with many water stains". It is one of the 100 famous mountains in Japan.

Geology
The peak of Mount Tomuraushi consists of mainly non-alkalai mafic rock from the Pleistocene to the Holocene.

History
On July 16, 2009, eight members of an adventure tour group on a 4-day hiking trek died of exposure on Mount Tomuraushi. Five others from the group were helicoptered to safety. On the same day, another climber died on nearby Mount Biei. The next day a lone hiker was found dead on Mount Tomuraushi.

References

External links

 Tomuraushi-Chubetsu Volcano Group - Geological Survey of Japan

Tomuraushi (Daisetsuzan)
Tomuraushi (Daisetsuzan)
Biei, Hokkaido